James Dalrymple Duncan Dalrymple of Woodhead FRSE FSA (7 July 1852 – 8 February 1908) was a Scottish landowner, antiquarian and keen amateur chemist, elected a Fellow of the Royal Society of Edinburgh. He was a Fellow of both the Society of Antiquaries of London and Society of Antiquaries of Scotland. In 1907 he was founder of the Dalrymple Lecture in Archaeology. His brother was Thomas Dalrymple of Woodhead (1854-1933).

Life

He was the son of Rev Thomas Gray Dalrymple (1808-1861) and Mary Dalrymple Duncan (1811-1895) of Kirkintilloch, on 7 July 1852.

From 1870 to 1872 and from 1878 to 1880 he was President of the Kirkintilloch Agricultural Society.
He was elected a Fellow of the Royal Society of Edinburgh in January 1889. His proposers were Sir James Robertson (Earl of Kintore), John Gray McKendrick, and John Ferguson.

Around 1900 he changed his name to James Dalrymple Gray Dalrymple at which time he was living at Meiklewood in Stirling. This probably reflected a desire to associate with his father’s name, now his influential mother was dead. In 1901 he is listed as resigning as a Director from the firm of Morrison & Duncan of Hope Street in Glasgow.
In later life he was a Justice of the Peace for both Dunbartonshire and Stirlingshire.

He died on 8 February 1908.

Family

He married Katherine Hutton Rowan of Holmfauldhead (b.1854)

Publications

Craignethan Castle
Bothwell Castle
A Visit to Les Saintes Maries de la Camargue, St Maximin and La Saint Baume (1890)
St Martin D’Auxigny: An Old Scots Colony in France (1890)
The Chateau of St Fargeau (1900)

Legacy

His country estate of Woodhead now forms Woodhead Park, gifted to Kirkintilloch in the early 20th century and formalised as a park in 1931.

The Dalrymple Fountain on Industry Street in Kirkintilloch was also gifted to the town.

Trivia

His mother, Mary Dalrymple Duncan, was the subject of an oil painting by John Gibson held by the Hunterian Museum and Art Gallery.

References

1852 births
1908 deaths
Fellows of the Royal Society of Edinburgh
People from Kirkintilloch
Scottish landowners
Scottish philanthropists
Scottish antiquarians
19th-century British philanthropists
19th-century Scottish businesspeople